Diamela Puentes (born 5 January 1981) is a Cuban softball player. She competed in the women's tournament at the 2000 Summer Olympics.

References

External links
 

1981 births
Living people
Cuban softball players
Olympic softball players of Cuba
Softball players at the 2000 Summer Olympics
Place of birth missing (living people)
World Games medalists in softball
World Games gold medalists